The Washington Eagles were an American minor pro ice hockey team from Washington, D.C. that played in the Eastern Hockey League from 1939 to 1942. During those three seasons the Eagles played 186 games with an overall record of 102 wins, 67 losses and 17 ties.

The Eagles won the league championship in 1940-41. In 1941-42 they competed for fans with the Washington Lions of the American Hockey League, which accounted for the Eagles' folding after the 1941-42 season.

Coach
They were coached in all three seasons by Redvers MacKenzie.

Notable players
Eagles who played in the NHL:
 Keith Allen
 Norm Burns
 Les Colvin
 Alan Kuntz
 Frank Mailley
 Rollie McLenahan
 Les Ramsay
 Roly Rossignol

References

Defunct ice hockey teams in the United States
Eastern Hockey League teams
Ice hockey clubs established in 1939
Sports clubs disestablished in 1942
Sports in Washington, D.C.
Ice hockey in Washington, D.C.
1939 establishments in Washington, D.C.
1940s disestablishments in Washington, D.C.